Auction Room is an Australian reality-television series, hosted by William McInnes and produced and aired by the Australian Broadcasting Corporation. The show premiered on Sunday 15 April 2012 at 6 pm, and was renewed for a second series which was broadcast from 7 October to 9 December 2012. Former Collectors panellist Gordon Brown was the presenter for the second series, replacing McInnes.

References

External links
Auction Room website

Australian Broadcasting Corporation original programming
2010s Australian reality television series
2012 Australian television series debuts
2012 Australian television series endings
Auction television series
Antiques television series